MDMAT (6,7-methylenedioxy-N-methyl-2-aminotetralin) is a putative, non-neurotoxic, selective serotonin releasing agent (SSRA) and entactogen drug. It is the N-methylated derivative of MDAT, similarly to the relationship of MDMA to MDA or MDMAI to MDAI.

See also
 2-Aminotetralin

References

Aminotetralins
Entactogens and empathogens
Designer drugs
Serotonin releasing agents